Phoenix Rising is the seventh studio album by power metal/neo-classical metal band Galneryus. The album reached number 23 on the Oricon album charts and #21 at the Billboard Japan Top Albums.

Track listing
All songs arranged by Galneryus and Yorimasa Hisatake.

Personnel
Syu - Guitar, Throat
Masatoshi Ono - Vocals
Taka - Bass
Junichi - Drums
Yuhki - Keyboards, Hammond organ

Production
Produced by Yorimisa Hisatake.
A&R Directed by Kentaro Tanaka for VAP.
Engineered by Atsushi Yamaguchi for MIT Studio.
Mixed by Naoki Sakurai.
Assistant Engineer: Yuichi Otsubo for MIT Studio.
Recorded & Mixed at MIT Studio.
Mastered by Yoichi Aikawa for Blue Mastering.
Mastered at Blue Mastering.

References

2011 albums
Galneryus albums